The Nhanda people, also spelt Nanda, Nhunda, Nhanta, and other variants, are an Aboriginal Australian people who live in the mid-west region of Western Australia around the mouth of the Murchison River.

Language
 
The traditional language of the people was Nhanda, which had three dialect varieties: Nhanda to the north, Watchandi in the centre, around Port Gregory, and the southern dialect of Amangu. It differed notably  from all the native languages spoken in contiguous areas in terms of its phonology, morphology and morphosyntax. Its system of bound pronouns appears to be unique to Australia.

Country
Their northern neighbours were the Malgana and the Nokaan, while on their southern border were the Amangu.

Nhanda people have been awarded exclusive native title rights over several key areas including Paradise Flats, Bully, Wilgie Mia, Mooliabatanya and Syphon pools.

Spring rites
Augustus Oldfield described the increase performances, Caroo, which took place in mid spring in the following terms:
At the time of the first new moon after the yams are ripe, the Watch-an-dies begin to lay in a stock of all kinds of food, sufficient to subsist them during the continuance of the festival. On the eve of the feast the women and children retire from the company of the men, shouting as they go, Ow-ee, Ow-ee, and henceforth, until the conclusion of the ceremony, the men are not permitted to look on a female, but sometimes, when their store of food prove insufficient, this law is a little infringed. The men thus left to themselves rub their bodies with a mixture of charcoal, ashes, and wallaby-fat; after which, having dug a large pit in the ground, they retire to rest, not, however, before they are gorged with the good things provided for the occasion. Early next morning they re-assemble and proceed to decorate themselves with a mixture of ochre and emu-fat, dressing their hair with fine shavings and wearing garlands of My-a-lie and A-rum-ba. This beautifying of their persons, with frequent feastings, lasts the whole day, but towards evening the real ceremony begins. They dance round the pit they have dug, shouting, singing, and some few whistling (this they never do in their common corrobories), and thus they continue all night long, each in turn snatching a few moments for rest and gormandising. Every figure of their dances, every gesture, the burden of all their songs, is calculated to inflame their passions. The pit is so dug and decorated with bushes as to represent the private parts of a female: as dance they carry the spear before them to simulate priapus: every gesture is obscene, and the character of the songs in vogue on such occasions may be understood from the following, which may be translated by means of the vocabulary:
Bool-lie neera, Bool-lie neera,
 Bool-lie neera. Wad-a-ga.

At the conclusion of the ceremonies, when, as my informant told me, Aumanno-maddijubat-wabayadia, they place sticks in the ground to mark the scene of their orgies, and henceforth that is a tabood place, and any looking on it, inadvertently or not, will infallibly sicken and die. For sometime after the feast the men who have held it wear shavings in their hair to distinguish them as Caa-ro men.'

Social organisation 
The Nhanda were divided into at least three groups:
 Buluguda
 Daguda (at Billiecutherra)
 Tamala (at Tamala Homestead)

They did not practise circumcision.

Alternative names
 Yau. (yo = "no")
 Jau Eaw (i'u =south)
 Watjandi. (watju means "west").
 Watchandi, Watchandie Buluguda (also a toponym).
 Bulgulu Tamala (also a toponym)
 DagudaSome words
 ithu(otthoo) (tame dog)
 ngobano. (wild dog)
 ama (amo) (father)
 agu (ago). (mother)
 erato (north)
 euna. (south)
 angalo. (east)
 watchu. (west)
 arnmanu ‘man, person’
 nyarlu (woman)
 abarla (child).

Notes

Citations

Sources

Aboriginal peoples of Western Australia